Esomus altus  is a species of cyprinid endemic to Myanmar.

References

Fish of Myanmar
Fish described in 1860
Taxa named by Edward Blyth
Esomus